Muqtida Hasan Nida Fazli, known as Nida Fazli (12 October 1938 – 8 February 2016), was a prominent Indian Hindi and Urdu poet, lyricist and dialogue writer. He was awarded the Padma Shri in 2013 by the government of India for his contribution to literature.

Early life and background
Born in New Delhi, into a Kashmiri Muslim family, Nida Fazli grew up in Gwalior, where he attended school and subsequently studied English literature. His father was also a very well known Urdu poet. Two of his other brothers mainly; Tasleem Fazli & Saba Fazli too were prominent names of Indo-Pak. Their contribution to literature through films/poetry and songs are still cherished today by their admirers both from India and Pakistan.

In 1965, eighteen years after the partition of India, his parents and other family members migrated to Pakistan. He however decided to stay back in India. This happened one year after Fazli had moved from Gwalior to Mumbai (in 1964) to earn a living. This departure of his parents was an epochal event in his life, the pain and repercussions of which would remain with him all his life.

Fazli was married twice. His second wife was Malti Joshi. They became the parents of a daughter, Tehreer.

Career

While still young, Fazli was passing by a Hindu temple where a bhajan singer was singing a composition of Surdas about Radha sharing her sorrow with her maids at being separated from her beloved Krishna. The poetic beauty of the Pad, relating to the close rapport and bonding between human beings, inspired Nida to begin writing poems.

During that period, he felt that there were limitations in Urdu poetry. He absorbed the essence of Mir and Ghalib to express what he intended. He was fascinated by the lyrical mood of Meera and Kabir and widened his knowledge of poetry by studying T. S. Eliot, Gogol and Anton Chekhov.

He moved to Mumbai in search of a job in 1964. In the early days of his career, he wrote in Dharmayug and Blitz . His poetic style attracted the notice of filmmakers and writers of Hindi and Urdu literature. He was often invited to Mushairas, the prestigious recitation sessions of one's own poetry. He became known among readers and ghazal singers for his elegant presentation and exclusive use of colloquial language for ghazals, dohaas and nazms, while avoiding ornate Persian imagery and compound words to simplify his poetry. He wrote the famous couplet: 'Duniya jise kehte hain jaadu kaa Khilona hai Mil jaaye to mitti hai kho jaaye to sona hai'. Some of his famous film songs include Aa bhi jaa (Sur), Tu is tarah se meri zindagi mein (Aap To Aise Na The) and Hosh waalon ko khabar Kya (Sarfarosh). He wrote essays critical of contemporary poets of the sixties in his book Mulaqatein which outraged poets including Sahir Ludhianvi, Ali Sardar Jafri and Kaifi Azmi. As a result, he was boycotted in some poetic sessions. His career improved when Kamal Amrohi, a filmmaker, approached him. The original songwriter Jan Nisar Akhtar working on the film Razia Sultan (1983) had died before completing the project. Nida wrote the final two songs and attracted other Hindi filmmakers.

His celebrated lyrics were also used in Aap to aise na the, Is Raat Ki Subah Nahin (1996) and Gudiya. He wrote the title song of TV serials like Sailaab, Neem ka Ped, Jaane Kya Baat Hui and Jyoti. The composition "Koi Akelaa Kahaan" is another popular composition sung by Kavita Krishnamurthy. His ghazals and other compositions are sung by notable artists of the day. He teamed up with Jagjit Singh in 1994 to bring an album named Insight, which got appreciation for its soulful poetry and music. Shortly before his death he wrote columns for BBC Hindi website on various contemporary issues and literature. Mirza Ghalib's works were often mentioned by him.

Style
Nida Fazli is a poet of various moods and to him the creative sentiment and inner urge are the sources of poetry. He thinks that the feeling of a poet is similar to an artist: like a painter or a musician. In contrast he found lyric writing a mechanical job as he had to fulfil the demands of the script and the director. Later he accepted the practical necessity of money which comes from lyric writing and helps one to ponder on creative work.

He published his first collection of Urdu poetry in 1969. Childhood imagery persistently reflects in his poetry as elements of nostalgia. Primary themes which run through his poetry are contradictions in life, the search for purpose, nuances of human relationships, differences between practice and preaching, and the groping for that which is lost.

Contribution towards communal harmony
Nida Fazli disagreed with the partition of India and has spoken out against the communal riots, politicians and fundamentalism. During the riots of December 1992 he had to take shelter in his friend's house due to security concerns.

He was honoured with the National Harmony Award for writing on communal harmony. He wrote 24 books in Urdu, Hindi and Gujarati — some of which are assigned as school textbooks in Maharashtra. Some of his works are also present in National Council of Educational Research and Training Hindi textbooks which millions of students study. He received the Mir Taqi Mir award for his autobiographical novel Deewaron Ke Bich from the Government of Madhya Pradesh.

Death 
Fazli died of a heart attack on 8 February 2016. He was aged 77 when he died. His death occurred on the 75th birth anniversary of the Ghazal singer Jagjit Singh, with whom he worked for many songs.

List of works

Poetry collections 
 Lafzun Ka Pul
 Mor Naach
 Aankh Aur Khawaab Ke Darmayan
 Khoya Huwa Sa Kuch
 Shehar Mere Sath Chal
 Zindagi Ki Tadap
 Sab Ka Hai Maahtaab
 Duniya Jise Kehte Hain
 Shehar Mein Gavaun (Kuliyaat)

Prose Collections 
 Mulaqatein
 Deewaron Ke Beech (autobiography part 1)
 Deewaron Ke Par (autobiography part 2)
 Chehre
 Dunya Mere Aage

Awards
 1998 Sahitya Akademi Award in Urdu for Khoya Hua Sa Kuchh (Poetry collection)
 2003 Star Screen Award for Best Lyricist for Sur
 2003 Bollywood Movie Award - Best Lyricist for Aa Bhi Ja from Sur
 2013 Padma Shri; the Government of India.

Filmography

As lyricist 
 Aap To Aise Na The (1980) آپ تو ایسے نہ تھے
 Red Rose (1980)
 Nakhuda (1981) ناخُدا
 Harjaee (1981) ہر جائی
 Anokha Bandhan (1982) انوکھا بندھن
 Razia Sultan (1983) رضیہ سُلطان
 Vijay (1988) وِجے
 Sajda
 Is Raat Ki Subah Nahin (1996) اِس رات کی صُبح نہیں
 Tamanna (1997) - Ghar se masjid hai
 Sarfarosh  (1999) - ہوش والوں کو خبر کیا
 Sur – The Melody of Life (2002) - (Aa bhee jaa, ai subha aa bhee jaa)' آ بھی جا اے صُبح آ بھی جا
 Dev (2004)
 Yatra (2006) یاترہ

As dialogue writer 
 Dev (2004) (co-writer)
 Yatra (2006)

References

External links 

 
 Nida Fazli at Kavita Kosh
 Nida Fazli Ghazals
 Ek Achhe Papa Kaise Bane?

1938 births
2016 deaths
Urdu-language poets from India
Screenwriters from Delhi
Kashmiri people
Hindi-language lyricists
Recipients of the Sahitya Akademi Award in Urdu
Recipients of the Padma Shri in literature & education
Indian male screenwriters
Urdu-language lyricists
Poets from Delhi
20th-century Indian dramatists and playwrights
20th-century Indian poets
20th-century Indian male writers